Lesticus insignis is a species of ground beetle in the subfamily Pterostichinae. It was described by Gestro in 1883.

References

Lesticus
Beetles described in 1883